The North Onezhsky mine (Severo-Onezhsky Boksitovy Rundnik)
is a large mine located in the northern part of Russia in Arkhangelsk Oblast. It operates on one of the sections of the Iksinskoye bauxite deposit (Иксинское месторождение).

North Onezhsky represents one of the largest bauxite reserve in Russia and one of the largest in Europe, having estimated reserves of 120 million tonnes.

The miners' town near the mine is called Severoonezhsk.

References 

Bauxite mines in Russia
Buildings and structures in Arkhangelsk Oblast